Dolenja Stara Vas is a settlement immediately southeast of the town of Šentjernej in southeastern Slovenia. The area is part of the traditional region of Lower Carniola. It is now included in the Southeast Slovenia Statistical Region. The village belongs to the Village Community of Grmovlje. 

The local church, built on hill to the east of the settlement, is dedicated to Saint Francis Xavier and belongs to the Parish of Šentjernej. It was built in 1745 to replace an older church dedicated to Saint Stephen.

References

External links
Dolenja Stara Vas on Geopedia

Populated places in the Municipality of Šentjernej